The Wakefield Case is a 1921 American silent mystery film directed by George Irving, produced by Lois Weber and starring Herbert Rawlinson. It was released through World Film Company.

Cast
Herbert Rawlinson as Wakefield Jr.
John P. Wade as Wakefield Sr.
J. H. Gilmour as Gregg
Charles Dalton as Richard Krogan
Joseph Burke as James Krogan
Jere Austin as Bryson (credited as Jerry Austin)
William Black as Blaine (credited as W. W. Black)
H. L. Dewey as Briggs
Florence Billings as Ruth Gregg

Preservation status
The Wakefield Case has been preserved in the Library of Congress collection.

References

External links

1921 films
American silent feature films
American black-and-white films
World Film Company films
Films directed by George Irving
American mystery films
1921 mystery films
1920s American films
Silent mystery films
1920s English-language films